Titanio originalis is a species of moth in the family Crambidae. It is found in Russia.

References

Moths described in 1860
Odontiini
Taxa named by Gottlieb August Wilhelm Herrich-Schäffer